Cornelis de Haan (before 1750 – 5 May 1793) was a Dutch Mennonite teacher and minister.

Little is known of him, but he was a member of the De Haan family of Haarlem Mennonites. Cornelis served in Haarlem in 1792, as a replacement for Cornelis Loosjes. He also succeeded Loosjes in his appointment as member of the Teylers First Society. He filled both positions for very short terms, as he died the next year, and was succeeded in both appointments by Matthias van Geuns Jz.

References

1793 deaths
People from Haarlem
Dutch Mennonites
Members of Teylers Eerste Genootschap
Mennonite ministers
Year of birth unknown
18th-century Anabaptist ministers
Year of birth uncertain